Sergio Gil Latorre (born 10 May 1996) is a Spanish footballer who plays as a central midfielder for Extremadura UD.

Football career
Born in Zaragoza, Aragon, Gil graduated from local Real Zaragoza's youth setup. He renewed his link with the club on 7 August 2013, and made his senior debuts with the reserves in the 2014–15 campaign, in the Segunda División B.

On 14 March 2015, Gil played his first match as a professional, coming on as a late substitute for Iñigo Ruiz de Galarreta in a 0–0 home draw against CD Lugo in the Segunda División. Ahead of the 2016–17 campaign, he was definitely promoted to the first team, but failed to appear during the club's pre-season, considering that his contract extension signed in the previous campaign was not valid.

On 31 August 2016, Gil signed a three-year contract with fellow league team CD Lugo. On 13 July 2019, he moved to Extremadura UD also in the second division, as a free agent.

References

External links

1996 births
Living people
Footballers from Zaragoza
Spanish footballers
Association football midfielders
Segunda División players
Segunda División B players
Real Zaragoza B players
Real Zaragoza players
CD Lugo players
Extremadura UD footballers